Grewia optiva, the bhimal, is a species of flowering plant in the family Malvaceae, native to the Indian Subcontinent.

A small tree, it has a number of agro-forestry uses. It is a good forage species, particularly in winter when no other leafy green fodder is available. Bhimal is one of the species preferred most by cattle. It is used in agro-forestry systems in the western Himalaya, in an intercropping system with plants such as taro (Colocasia esculenta) and turmeric (Curcuma longa). The resilient timber is used for firewood, and for items such as bows, oars, poles, and tool handles.

References

optiva
Flora of Pakistan
Flora of West Himalaya
Flora of Nepal
Flora of East Himalaya
Flora of India
Plants described in 1926
Taxa named by Max Burret